KQML-LD, virtual channel 46 (UHF digital channel 35), is a low-power television station in Kansas City, Missouri, United States, affiliated with Rewind TV. The station is owned by HC2 Holdings.

History 
The station's construction permit was initially issued on July 11, 2012 under the calls of K46MA-D and changed to KQML-LD.

On December 31, 2022, Azteca América ceased operations.

Subchannels

References

External links
DTV America

Low-power television stations in the United States
Innovate Corp.
Television stations in Missouri
Television channels and stations established in 2012
2012 establishments in Kansas
Twist (TV network) affiliates
Classic Reruns TV affiliates